Place Vendome may refer to:
Place Vendôme, a square in the 1st arrondissement of Paris, France
Place Vendôme (film), a 1998 French film
Place Vendome (band), a rock band
 Place Vendome (Place Vendome album), their 2005 debut album
Place Vendôme (Swingle Singers with MJQ album), a jazz album by the Swingle Singers and the Modern Jazz Quartet (1966)